Lady Margaret Hospital is a small 10-bedded hospital at Millport on Great Cumbrae in North Ayrshire, Scotland. It is managed by NHS Ayrshire and Arran.

History 
The foundation stone for the new "Millport Infectious Diseases Hospital" was laid by Sir Charles Dalrymple, a former Grand Master Mason of the Grand Lodge of Scotland, on 13 January 1900. The building, designed by architects Fryer & Penman of Largs, consisted of red sandstone forming three blocks - one for male patients, another for female patients, and the third for the administrative staff. It was officially opened by Lady Margaret Crichton-Stuart, daughter of John Crichton-Stuart, 3rd Marquess of Bute, on 25 September 1900.

The facility was converted to a general hospital in 1929 and joined the National Health Service as the Lady Margaret Hospital (named in recognition of the person who opened it) in 1948.

Services 
The hospital has facilities for treating minor injuries.

References 

Hospitals in North Ayrshire
NHS Ayrshire and Arran
NHS Scotland hospitals
The Cumbraes